Kaci Lyn Battaglia (born October 3, 1987, in Clearwater, Florida), also known as Kaci, is an American former singer, songwriter and dancer. Kaci gained fame in 2001 with her hit single "Paradise".

Early life
Kaci Battaglia was born and raised in Clearwater, Florida, part of the Tampa Bay region, into a musical family. She is the daughter of Danny Battaglia and Donna DeVille. Battaglia began singing when she was three years old, and often performed at her father's karaoke club. By the age of eight she began performing throughout Florida for dignitaries, in concerts, and for sports events. In 2001, Battaglia tested at post-high school levels of knowledge in all subjects. She began attending St. Petersburg College both online and on campus between tours.

Music career
At age 11, Battaglia independently released A Thousand Stars, an album that was produced by her mother, Donna. A portion of the proceeds from A Thousand Stars went to help a housing project for the less fortunate. Battaglia began looking for a recording contract when she was eleven years old, due to the success of her independent album. She caught attention of record producer Joel Diamond after Battaglia's mother called and asked Diamond to audition her daughter. Diamond put up his own money to record her. After he was turned down by over 20 record labels with his demo, "Paradise" featuring for Battaglia, Mike Curb called Diamond months after receiving the recording and told him that he wanted to sign Battaglia to Curb Records.

Her debut single "Paradise", a cover of the theme song originally sung by Phoebe Cates in the 1982 film Paradise, was released in 2001 and hit number 11 in the UK. Battaglia's Latin-flavored second single "Tu Amor" was released in the UK on July of the same year, scoring a more moderate impact on the charts, peaking at number 24. Her third single was a cover of Tony Romeo's, "I Think I Love You". It became her only top 10 hit in the UK in February of the year 2002.
In 2003, she teamed up with a Japanese photographer and released a photo book entitled, Kaci: I'm a Singer. This photo book was filled with pictures of Battaglia while in her hometown in Florida. The book was released in 2007 exclusively in Japan, along with a re-release of her album, Paradise. Kaci performed a song, "I Will Learn to Love Again" for the 2005 film The Perfect Man.

She released "I Can't Help Myself", a track that was serviced to dance radio stations and does not appear on the record.  Her single "Crazy Possessive" reached number one on the Billboard Dance chart. Another single, "Body Shots" was featured on episode 8x02 of The CW's One Tree Hill also reached number one on the Billboard Dance chart. Her album Bring It On was released in 2010 only in Japan as a physical release, however it was released as a digital download in the United States.

Personal life
She parted ways with Curb Records in 2013. Kaci is working towards a Bachelor of Science degree in Electrical Engineering. Since departing from the entertainment industry, she has become a born-again Christian and an animal rights activist seeking an end to the dog meat industry. On February 13, 2016, Kaci married Selleck Keene in Clearwater. They have a daughter born April 2018.

Discography

Albums
A Thousand Stars (1998)
Paradise (2001) (World - 200,000)
Bring It On (2010) (World - 100,000)

Singles

Touring
 Opener for various artists including, O-Town, Backstreet Boys and Westlife.
 WFLZ 93.3's The Big One: August 25, 2001; St. Pete Times Forum (formerly the Ice Palace Arena) in Tampa, Florida. (radio show)
 ESPN's Super Bowl Halftime Show: January 2002; Video for her single, "Paradise" was played.
 Pepsi's Your Taste, Your Style, Your Night of Shopping 2002: August 2002; Mall Tour
 Capital One Bowl Halftime Show: January 1, 2003, Orlando, Florida
 93Q & Coors Light Balloon Fest: June 14, 2003 in Syracuse (Jamesville), New York
 Gay Pride Pink Saturday Concert: June 27, 2009 in San Francisco, California
 Gay Pride Festival Saturday Concert: May 1, 2010 in Las Vegas, Nevada

Filmography

References

External links

Curve Magazine - Kaci Battaglia is Breaking Out - 2009 interview
“Kaci Battaglia  at ”Ok Magazine
 Starpulse.com - Pop Sensation Kaci Battaglia Returns With Ludacris On Hit Single 'Body Shots' (Video)
IGN.com - Babe of the Day: Kaci Battaglia - September 2009
TheSmokingJacket.com - Ballbreaker: Kaci Battaglia - September 2010

1987 births
Living people
American child singers
American dance musicians
American women pop singers
American women singer-songwriters
American people of Italian descent
21st-century American women singers